KFAT may refer to:

 The ICAO code for Fresno Yosemite International Airport, located in Fresno, California, United States
 KFAT (FM), a radio station (92.9 FM) licensed to Anchorage, Alaska, United States
 KFAT (defunct), a defunct radio station (94.5 FM) located in Gilroy, California, United States
 National Union of Knitwear, Footwear & Apparel Trades